Nuorese may refer to:

 A dialect of the Sardinian language
 F.C. Nuorese Calcio, a football (soccer) team from Nuoro

See also
 Nuoro